"Lullaby of the Leaves" is a musical composition by composer Bernice Petkere and lyricist Joe Young. A Tin Pan Alley song first performed in 1932, the jazz standard is considered the biggest critical and commercial success of Petkere's composing career.

The song was a hit for  George Olsen and his Music in 1932. By January 1933, more than 500,000 copies had been sold in the U.S.; a hit in the era was anything selling at least 50,000 copies.

It has since been recorded numerous times in its lyrical version and as an instrumental, including a rousing version by The Ventures in 1961, a lively version by Mary Lou Williams in the 1950s and a version by Ella Fitzgerald on her 1964 album Hello, Dolly!.

From 2019 to 2020, Italian ice dancers Jasmine Tessari and Francesco Fioretti skated to Beth Hart's rendition of the song in competitions.

Edited versions of George Olsen's as well as Layton and Johnstone's rendition have been used in the popular album Everywhere at the End of Time in the tracks "Misplaced in time" and "Drifting time misplaced", causing a mild resurgence in the song's popularity.

References

1932 songs